Lefors, Texas, a town in Gray County, Texas, United States
 Stefan LeFors, a former quarterback in American and Canadian football